Marianne Allen Tasker (1852–1911) was a New Zealand domestic servant, feminist, community leader and trade unionist. She was born in Brighton, Sussex, England in 1852. Living in Gisborne she represented the Women's Democratic Union in the founding year of the National Council of Women of New Zealand (1896) and served as a Vice President from 1897 to 1900.

References

1852 births
1911 deaths
Servants
New Zealand feminists
New Zealand trade unionists
English emigrants to New Zealand
New Zealand domestic workers